The Samuel Moody Grubbs House is a historic house located at 805 E. Union Ave. in Litchfield, Illinois. The house was built in 1873-74 for Samuel Moody Grubbs, a banker who later became Litchfield's mayor. George Ingham Barnett, a prominent St. Louis architect, designed the Second Empire house; it is the only standing Barnett design in Illinois. The design is typical of the second half of Barnett's career, when he shifted from Italianate to Second Empire designs, and represents a popular style in postbellum America. A mansard roof with slate tiles tops the house; a cornice running along the roofline features paired brackets. The front of the house features a wraparound porch supported by columns. The house's corners have bold quoins. In a deviation from the typical rectangular plans of Second Empire houses, Barnett gave the house a cross axis plan with projecting wings.

The house was added to the National Register of Historic Places on February 21, 1990.

References

Houses on the National Register of Historic Places in Illinois
Second Empire architecture in Illinois
Houses completed in 1874
Houses in Montgomery County, Illinois
National Register of Historic Places in Montgomery County, Illinois